Francis John Sloan (26 December 1904 – 1974) was a Scottish professional footballer who played in the English Football League for Plymouth Argyle and Luton Town. He played as an inside right.

Sloan was born in Chapelhall, North Lanarkshire. He played for Shieldmuir Celtic in his native Scotland before coming to England in 1920 to play for Plymouth Argyle. He made 213 appearances for the club in all competitions over 12 seasons, the last of which came in February 1936. He then spent a brief spell at Luton Town before returning to Argyle as a member of the groundstaff.

References

1904 births
1974 deaths
Footballers from North Lanarkshire
Scottish footballers
Association football inside forwards
Plymouth Argyle F.C. players
Luton Town F.C. players
English Football League players
Date of death missing
Place of death missing